Hell of a Ride is the eighth studio album by Australian recording artist Adam Brand. The album was released in March 2009 and peaked at number 19 on the ARIA charts.
The album includes the track "Ready for Love" which peaked at umber 46 on the Billboard Hot Country Songs in 2010. This is Brand's only US charting single to date.

At the AIR Awards of 2009, the album won Best Independent Country Album.

Track listing

Charts

Weekly charts

Year-end charts

Release history

References

2009 albums
Adam Brand (musician) albums
Albums produced by Richard Landis